The European Potato Failure was a food crisis caused by potato blight that struck Northern and Western Europe in the mid-1840s. The time is also known as the Hungry Forties. While the crisis produced excess mortality and suffering across the affected areas, particularly affected were the Scottish Highlands and, even more harshly, Ireland. Many people starved due to lack of access to other staple food sources.

Potatoes at the time 
In 2013, researchers analysed biological collections in museums with DNA sequencing techniques to decode DNA from the pathogen in stored samples from 1845 and compare them to modern genetic types. The results indicated the "strain was different from all the modern strains analysed".

After the blight, strains originating in the Chiloé Archipelago replaced earlier potatoes of Peruvian origin in Europe.

Population decline 
The effect of the crisis on Ireland is incomparable to all other places, causing one million deaths, up to two million refugees, and spurring a century-long population decline. Excluding Ireland, the death toll from the crisis is estimated to be in the region of 100,000 people. Of this, Belgium and Prussia account for most of the deaths, with 40,000–50,000 estimated to have died in Belgium, with Flanders particularly affected, and about 42,000 estimated to have perished in Prussia. The remainder of deaths occurred mainly in France, where 10,000 people are estimated to have died as a result of famine-like conditions.

Aside from death from starvation and famine diseases, suffering came in other forms. While the demographic impact of famines is immediately visible in mortality, longer-term declines of fertility and natality can also dramatically affect population. In Ireland births fell by a third, resulting in about 0.5 million "lost lives". Declines elsewhere were lower: Flanders lost 20–30%, the Netherlands about 10–20%, and Prussia about 12%.

Emigration to escape the famine centred mainly on Ireland and the Scottish Highlands. Elsewhere in the United Kingdom and on the continent, conditions were not so harsh as to completely eradicate the basics of survival so as to require mass migration of the sort experienced in Ireland and Scotland. Over 16,500 emigrated from the Scottish Highlands (out of a population affected by famine of no more than 200,000), many assisted by landlords and the Highland and Island Emigration Society, mainly to North America and Australia, this forming part of the second phase of the Highland Clearances. The global consequence of this was the creation of a substantial Irish diaspora.

Political effects 
The widespread hunger and starvation is commonly thought to be a cause of political changes during the mid 19th century. The Revolutions of 1848 saw widespread dissatisfaction among European peasants who saw a decline in their standard of living and so, along with other reasons, led many to join revolutions in various countries. Similarly, in Ireland, the potato famine saw a rise in Irish nationalism, exemplified in the 1848 Young Irelander Rebellion, again partly caused by discontentedness with hunger and the British government's perceived role.

See also 
 History of the potato
 Revolutions of 1848, of which this crop failure was a cause

References 

History of the potato
Fotato Failure
Failure
1840s economic history
19th-century famines